Tejarat Bank (Persian: بانک تجارت, Bank Tejarat, Mercantile Bank also "Commerce Bank") is an Iranian Bank.

History (1887 – 1995)

In 1887 a British bank named The East Modern Bank (Bank Jadid Sharq) established branches in some cities of Iran such as Tehran, Tabriz, Rasht, Mashhad, Isfahan, Shiraz, and Bushehr. In 1888, on the basis of a 60-year concession awarded to Baron Paul Reuter (the founder of Reuters News Agency) by Naser od-Din Shah, (Qajar shah of Iran: 1848-96), the facilities of The East Modern Bank were assigned to Bank Shahanshahi.

The dealing center in Tehran and the bank were recognized under the laws of Britain, and London was its main center. This bank established some branches in other cities of Iran, and also in various other countries. The exclusive privileges of publishing paper money, tax exemption, performing commercial-industrial affairs, profiting from all subterranean resources, etcetera was awarded to the mentioned bank. Concentration of the governmental accounts and the treasury funds in Bank Shahi and the said bank's interference in marital and civic affairs led to its absolute domination of the financial affairs of Iran.

Since Bank Shahi was a private institution, it never solved a problem for the Iranian Government. Bank Shahi supplied useful services in the field of industries of Britain and export of the agricultural products required for this country's industry. This function led to development of the economic power of Britain, and increasing the economic influence of this country in Iran.

Bank Shahi continued to be active under the same title until February 1949 when its 60-year concession expired, and thereafter renamed "British Bank in Iran and Middle East", it continued to be active until August 1952 without the former concession and rights. Gradually as a result of the anti-colonialism campaigns of the Iranian people and the statement of Ayatollah Kashani on September 20, 1951, the bank was dismissed from all the banking transactions such as gavel bills, opening current accounts, and any kinds of banking works. Finally, on Nov 07 1952 after Bank Shahi's 60-year concession expired, a bank named Bank Bazargani (which means Commerce Bank in Persian) with 100% investment in Iran bought the place of Bank Shahi for an amount of IRR 36’000’000 and a national institution took the place of a foreign institution. The capital of the bank was IRR 1’500’000’000 divided to 150’000 registered shares of IRR 10’000 all of which were paid. The said bank on March 20, 1978 had 102 branches in Tehran, 140 branches in other cities of Iran, two branches outside the country (Hamburg and London), and a total of 3801 employees.

To execute the Banks Nationalization Act approved in 1979 and subsequently in execution of the bank's integration; integrating Bank Bazargani, five domestic commercial banks, and six previous multi-nationality banks which were active in international and domestic fields, Bank Tejarat (which means Mercantile or Commerce Bank in Persian) was established.

Recent history
 
In 2009 the bank was partially privatized, with the Iranian state remaining as a minority shareholder.

In January 2014, the European General Court in Luxembourg ruled to annul the European Union (EU) sanctions in place since 2012 against the bank on grounds of supporting the Iranian nuclear program as there was inadequate evidence supporting the claim. Sanctions will remain in place giving time for the EU to appeal the decision, or to re-impose sanctions on different legal grounds. In April 2015 sanctions were re-imposed on new legal grounds. All sanctions were lifted after the Iran's deal with the six world powers on the nuclear program resulted in the embargo being lifted.

International branches
Tejarat Bank has six branches in other countries.

Subsidiary companies
Tejarat Bank is one of the main shareholders of Kardan Investment Bank alongside Saman Bank and Middle East Bank which was founded in 2014.

See also

Banking and insurance in Iran
List of Iranian companies
Privatization in Iran

References

External links
 www.cibafi.org
 www.zawya.com

Banks of Iran
Banks established in 1979
Companies listed on the Tehran Stock Exchange
Iranian companies established in 1979